O.K. ... Laliberté is a Canadian comedy-drama film, directed by Marcel Carrière and released in 1973.

The film stars Jacques Godin as Paul Laliberté, a 40-year-old man in Montreal who is embarking on the process of rebuilding his life after a midlife crisis has led him to leave his wife and quit his job. Moving into a rooming house, he takes a new job as a pest exterminator, begins a new romantic relationship with Yvonne (Luce Guilbeault) and reconnects with his old drinking buddy Louis (Jean Lapointe), but soon finds that his new life is no more fulfilling than what he has left behind.

Godin won the Canadian Film Award for Best Actor for his performance.

References

External links

 (requires Adobe Flash) (in French)

1973 films
Canadian comedy-drama films
National Film Board of Canada films
Films set in Montreal
Films directed by Marcel Carrière
Films shot in Montreal
1970s French-language films
Midlife crisis films
French-language Canadian films
1970s Canadian films